Felicito Payumo (born March 7, 1937) is a Filipino businessman and politician currently serving as chairman of University of Nueva Caceres–Bataan. He represented the First District of Bataan in the House of Representatives of the Philippines from 1987 to 1998, and served as chairman of the Subic Bay Metropolitan Authority from 1998 to 2004 and Bases Conversion and Development Authority from 2011 to 2012, respectively.

Biography
Born in Dinalupihan, Bataan, Payumo graduated valedictorian from the Northern Bataan Institute. He studied at the Ateneo de Manila University, where he completed his Bachelor of Science, Major in Economics, cum laude. He holds an MBA from Harvard Business School on an S.C. Johnson Scholarship. He completed the Executive Program for Leaders in Development at the John F. Kennedy School of Government.

He worked in the private sector for more than twenty years, including stints at Procter and Gamble Philippines, Mobil Corporation in New York, and Engineering Equipment Incorporated, where he served as president before venturing into politics.

As legislator, he was voted as one of "Top 10 Congressmen" from the 8th to the 10th Congress.  He was principal author of the Build, Operate, and Transfer Law, the Philippine Economic Zone Authority (PEZA) Law, and the Act converting the military bases into special economic zones. He served as chairman of the Committee on Public Works during the 8th Congress and chairman of the Committee on Economic Affairs during the 9th and 10th Congress.

Marriage and children
He is married to Daisy Sison of Naga City.  They have one son and four daughters.

Awards
2003: Three Outstanding Filipinos (TOFIL), Philippine Jaycee Senate.

References

1937 births
Living people
Ateneo de Manila University alumni
Harvard Business School alumni
Chairmen of the Subic Bay Metropolitan Authority
Members of the House of Representatives of the Philippines from Bataan
People from Bataan
Benigno Aquino III administration personnel
Arroyo administration personnel
Estrada administration personnel